Phenom was a progressive rock group from Bangalore, India, notable for being one of the first Indian rock groups to release their work under a Creative Commons license . Phenom last performed in concert on July 29, 2006.

Creative Commons
On January 26, 2007, Phenom's album Unbound was included on the CD distributed at the Creative Commons India License launch in recognition of it being the first Creative Commons licensed music coming out of India.

Members

2006 Lineup
 Gaurav Joshua Vaz – Bass and Backing Vocals
 Mrinal Kalakrishnan – Drums and Backing Vocals
 Jnaneshwar "JD" Das – Keyboards and Backing Vocals
 Trinity "Tiny" D'Souza – Lead Guitar
 Mark Lazaro – Lead Vocals
 Yashraj Jaiswal – Drums and Background musics

2004 Lineup
 Gaurav Joshua Vaz – Bass and Lead Vocals
 Sashi Wapang – Lead Guitar and Backing Vocals (left group in June 2004)
 Mrinal Kalakrishnan – Drums and Backing Vocals
 Jnaneshwar "JD" Das – Keyboards and Backing Vocals

2002 Lineup
 Gaurav Joshua Vaz – Guitar and Backing Vocals
 Sashi Wapang – Lead Guitar
 Mrinal Kalakrishnan – Drums and Backing Vocals
 Jnaneshwar "JD" Das – Keyboards and Backing Vocals
 Noella D'Sa – Lead Vocals (left group in early 2003)
 Deepu Jobie John – Bass (left group in mid-2002)

Discography

2004: Phenom Unbound
The album was released under a Creative Commons license and contained five songs.

 "Unbound" 
 "Coloured for this world"
 "CAP 5101"
 "Resurgence"
 "A Little Step"

TV Series
 Sacred Games - (2018)

References

External links
 http://wearephenom.com – Official Website
 http://www.swaroopch.info/archives/2005/12/03/linux-can/ Video of Phenom performing "Linux Can!" at FOSS.IN/2005
 http://www.dnaindia.com/report.asp?NewsID=1001566&CatID=2 Article about Phenom's "Linux Can!"
  The Hindu reports on Phenom

Indian progressive rock groups
Musical groups established in 2001